Jeux sans frontières was a Europe-wide television game show. The 1996 edition was won by the team from Kecskemét in Hungary.

Participating countries

Heats

Heat 1

Heat 2

Heat 3

Heat 4

Heat 5

Heat 6

Heat 7

Heat 8

Heat 9  

Lumino from Switzerland withdrew after the first event, in which one of their members was injured.

Final 

The teams which qualified from each country to the final were:

Final table

Jeux sans frontières
1996 television seasons
Television game shows with incorrect disambiguation